Man-Proof is a 1938 American romantic comedy film directed by Richard Thorpe. The film is based on the 1937 novel The Four Marys written by Fannie Heaslip Lea.

Plot
The daughter of wealthy and famous novelist Meg Swift, Mimi is a young woman who seems to have a perfect life. The opposite appears to be the case, as her deep love for playboy Alan Wythe remains unanswered. Despite her mother's newspaper artist friend Jimmy Kilmartin warnings of Alan's scandalous past revolving women, Mimi is determined to one day become Mrs. Wythe. However, another woman beats her to the title. Mimi is crushed when she finds out that Alan is marrying heiress Elizabeth Kent, but swallows her pride to serve as the bridesmaid.

At the wedding, Mimi overhears snobbish women gossiping about her love life. As a result, she gets drunk and admits to Alan she is in love with him. Later that night, Jimmy attempts to console her, as does Meg. Encouraged by her mother, Mimi agrees to move out of the house and build up a career to forget Alan. After moving in an apartment, Jimmy arranges her a job as an illustrator at his newspaper. Months go by and Mimi has become a happy woman, although she has not forgot about Alan. When she receives notice of Alan and Elizabeth's return from their honeymoon, she pretends she no longer has feelings for Alan.

Encouraged by those thoughts, she even agrees to meet Alan and offers him to be friends. Alan is interested in the thought of befriending a woman and they decide on going out. Meg and Jimmy spot them attending a boxing match and are immediately worried. The next day, following a joyful night with Alan, Mimi admits to Jimmy that she is still in love with Alan. Jimmy tries to prevent her from breaking up a marriage, but Mimi is determined to convince Alan to divorce Elizabeth so they can marry. She calls Elizabeth and informs her of her true feelings.

Later that day, Alan, despite being discouraged by Jimmy, meets Mimi with plans of continuing their affair. He is worried, though, when he finds out he is to divorce Elizabeth. They are interrupted by a visit from Elizabeth, who blames her husband for being too selfish. Alan agrees with his wife, and accompanies Elizabeth to save their marriage, leaving Mimi behind crushed. Yet again, Jimmy consoles Mimi and they agree on ending their quarrel over their different views on morality. After arriving at Meg's, they realize they have been in love with each other the entire time and they kiss.

Cast
 Myrna Loy as Mimi Swift
 Franchot Tone as Jimmy Kilmartin
 Rosalind Russell as Elizabeth Kent
 Walter Pidgeon as Alan Wythe
 Nana Bryant as Meg Swift
 John Miljan as Tommy Gaunt
 Gwen Lee as Binnie Bell
 Rita Johnson as Florence (scenes deleted)
 Ruth Hussey as Jane (scenes deleted)
 George Chandler as Newspaper Room Employee (uncredited)

Production
Man-Proof went into production in 1937 under the working title The Four Marys. In July 1937, it was announced that Richard Thorpe would direct the film, with Myrna Loy, Rosalind Russell, Melvyn Douglas and Franchot Tone in the leading roles. Douglas was replaced by Walter Pidgeon.

By the time shooting started, Myrna Loy was mourning with the death of her friend and colleague Jean Harlow. Nevertheless, she recalled that she experienced production of Man-Proof as joyful because of her positive experience with co-stars Pidgeon and Rosalind Russell. Loy and Russell became friends during shooting, and they frequently had tried for the same movie roles in the past.

Reception
The film received generally negative reviews, and critics complained that the film was "trifling," "thin" and "clichéd." Furthermore, Man-Proof flopped at the box office.

Box office
According to MGM records, the film earned $824,000 in the U.S. and Canada and $271,000 i other markets, resulting in a profit of $217,000.

References

External links

 
 
 
 

1938 films
1938 romantic comedy films
American romantic comedy films
American black-and-white films
1930s English-language films
Films scored by Franz Waxman
Films based on American novels
Films directed by Richard Thorpe
Metro-Goldwyn-Mayer films
1930s American films